The 2001-02 Zurich Premiership was the 15th season of the top flight of the English domestic rugby union competitions.

Leeds Tykes were promoted to replace the relegated Rotherham.

Halfway through the season, with Leicester odds-on to win their fourth title in succession, it was decided that the winners of the playoffs would be crowned champions.  After a public outcry at moving the goalposts halfway through the tournament, this was not followed through.  Instead, they launched the Zurich Championship, a play off competition involving 8 teams below the champions, providing the winner with a 'wildcard' European qualification.  Leicester did finish top of the league and were crowned champions; their fourth title in succession and their sixth overall.  Gloucester won the eight team Zurich Championship play-offs in 2001–02.

Leeds Tykes finished bottom of the table but avoided relegation due to the inadequacies of Rotherham's ground.

Participating teams

Table

Results

Week 1

Week 2

Week 3

Week 4

Week 5

Week 6

Week 7

Week 8

Week 9

Week 10

Week 11

Week 12

Week 13

Week 14

Week 15

Week 16

Week 17

Week 18

Week 19

Week 20

Week 21

Week 22

Week 23

Week 24

Playoff

Seeding

Quarter-finals

Semi-finals

Final

Leading scorers
Note: Flags to the left of player names indicate national team as has been defined under World Rugby eligibility rules, or primary nationality for players who have not earned international senior caps. Players may hold one or more non-WR nationalities.

Most points 
Source:

Most tries
Source:

Total Season Attendances

References

2001-02
 
England